Moll's Gap or Céim an Daimh (meaning, Gap of the Ox), is a mountain pass on the N71 road from Kenmare to Killarney in Kerry, Ireland. 

Moll's Gap is on the Ring of Kerry route, and offers views of the MacGillycuddy's Reeks mountains, and is a popular tourist location.  The rocks at Moll's gap are formed of Old Red Sandstone, which are small quartz grains laid down over 350 million years ago; unlike most of the Old Red Sandstone around Killarney which is stained red by iron oxide, the rock at Moll's gap is stained green by chlorite. Moll's Gap is named after Moll Kissane, who ran a shebeen (an unlicensed public house) in the 1820s, while the road was under construction. 

Like the nearby Gap of Dunloe, Moll's Gap is an example of a "glacial breach", where a 500 metre deep glacier in the Black Valley broke through Moll's Gap 25,000 years ago during Ireland's last ice age.

See also

 Gap of Dunloe
 Black Valley
 Ladies View

References

Geography of County Kerry
Tourist attractions in County Kerry
Mountain passes of Ireland